The Albatros Al 101 was a 1930s German trainer aircraft. It was a parasol-wing monoplane of conventional configuration, and seated the pilot and instructor in separate, open cockpits.

Variants
 L 101 
 L 101W – two examples built as floatplanes
 L 101C
 L 101D

Specifications (Al 101D)

See also

References

Notes

Bibliography

External links

 German Aviation 1919-1945

High-wing aircraft
Single-engined tractor aircraft
1930s German civil trainer aircraft
Al 101